Kappa Kappa Kappa, Inc., commonly known as Tri Kappa is a women's philanthropic organization with chapters throughout the U.S. state of Indiana.  It has approximately 8,000 members in more than 140 chapters.

History
Tri Kappa was founded in 1901 in Indianapolis, Indiana by seven students at the Girls' Classical School.  Its founders were:

Soon after election of their first officers the Founders wrote a constitution avowing their purpose to be "charity and kindness."  

Each of the founders was charged with the obligation to create a Tri Kappa chapter in her hometown. A Beta chapter was established later in 1902 in New Harmony, under the direct leadership of the founders. By 1903 the organization, now grown to seven chapters, held its first convention, meeting in Bloomington, Indiana at the Opera House.  There, the name of the official magazine was determined as Cross Keys. 

By 1913 the organization had grown to 45 chapters. That year it awarded its first scholarship, in the amount of $225 for a female student at the Bloomington Normal School (now Indiana State University).  Contributions had been raised via donations of $5 per member.

Chapter growth continued, with the provision that the organization remain limited to the state of Indiana.

The list of groups supported by Tri Kappa charity has expanded, with an additional recipient named approximately every decade, ranging from hospitals, to schools and art institutes, to support of statewide Ronald McDonald houses.

Branding complexity
The female-only organization notes "there has always been some discussion" over the awkward branding problem cause by similarity of Tri Kappa's name and the unaffiliated racist group which uses the same initials.  Hence, the female organization has tended to use "Tri Kappa" as its standard branding and common name, avoiding use of the letters even on its website. 

In spite of any branding difficulty which confusion over the letters may cause, Tri Kappa has grown within the state of Indiana, with a stable membership of approximately 8,000 members operating out of 142 chapters and almost 100 associate chapters.

Purposes
Tri Kappa chapters support local philanthropic project and raise money collectively for statewide projects. The organization reports "Each year local chapters and the state organization give over $1.5 million to its endeavors of charity, culture and education."

Notable philanthropic projects include:
 The Tri Kappa Art Collection housed at Rose-Hulman Institute of Technology
 Support of Riley Hospital for Children
 Support of the Ronald McDonald House
 Support of the Hoosier Salon
 College Scholarships
 Gifted and talented programs at Purdue University, Indiana State University, Rose-Hulman, and the Indiana Academy at Ball State University.

Symbolism and traditions
At inception, the organization chose crossed keys, a triangle and the white carnation as symbols.  The crossed keys are the predominant symbol used on the organization's pledge pin today, which remains a rectangular gold badge, while the keys, triangle and carnation are used on the official member badge.  The member badge may be observed with variants of the organization's three jewels at the triangle's corners, either ruby, sapphire or pearl.

Following this early symbolism, the name of the organization's magazine is Cross Keys.

References

External links

1901 establishments in Indiana
Fraternities and sororities based in Indianapolis
Student organizations established in 1901
Women's organizations based in the United States